Certolizumab pegol, sold under the brand name Cimzia, is a biologic medication for the treatment of Crohn's disease, rheumatoid arthritis, psoriatic arthritis and ankylosing spondylitis. It is a fragment of a monoclonal antibody specific to tumor necrosis factor alpha (TNF-α) and is manufactured by UCB.

It is on the World Health Organization's List of Essential Medicines.

Medical uses

Crohn's Disease On April 22, 2008, the U.S. Food and Drug Administration (FDA) approved Cimzia for the treatment of Crohn's disease in people who did not respond sufficiently or adequately to standard therapy.

Rheumatoid arthritis On June 26, 2009, the Committee for Medicinal Products for Human Use (CHMP) of the European Medicines Agency (EMA) issued a positive opinion recommending that the European Commission grant a marketing authorisation for Cimzia for the treatment of rheumatoid arthritis only - the CHMP refused approval for the treatment of Crohn's disease. The marketing authorisation was granted to UCB Pharma SA on October 1, 2009.

Psoriatic arthritis On September 27, 2013, the U.S. FDA approved Cimzia for the treatment of adult patients with active psoriatic arthritis.

Method of action 

Certolizumab pegol is a monoclonal antibody directed against tumor necrosis factor alpha. More precisely, it is a PEGylated Fab' fragment of a humanized TNF inhibitor monoclonal antibody.

Clinical trials

Crohn's disease Positive results have been demonstrated in two phase III trials (PRECiSE 1 and 2) of certolizumab pegol versus placebo in moderate to severe active Crohn's disease.

Axial spondyloarthritis In 2013, a phase 3 double blind randomized placebo-controlled study found significantly positive results in patient self-reported questionnaires, with rapid improvement of function and pain reduction, in patients with axial spondyloarthritis.

Rheumatoid arthritis Certolizumab appears beneficial in those with rheumatoid arthritis.

Side effects 

Significant side effects occur in 2% of people who take the medication.

References

External links 
 
 

Biotechnology
TNF inhibitors
Immunosuppressants
Belgian inventions
World Health Organization essential medicines
Monoclonal antibodies
Disease-modifying antirheumatic drugs